George Sternberg may refer to:

 George Miller Sternberg (1838–1915), U.S. Army physician and bacteriologist
 George F. Sternberg (1883–1969), American paleontologist